Uropoda is a genus of tortoise mites in the family Uropodidae. There are more than 70 described species in Uropoda.

Species
These 78 species belong to the genus Uropoda:

 Uropoda adfixa Vitzthum, 1921
 Uropoda admixta Vitzthum, 1921
 Uropoda alpina Berlese, 1904
 Uropoda amblyoponae Banks, 1916
 Uropoda anthropophagorum Vitzthum, 1921
 Uropoda apicata Banks, 1916
 Uropoda arrhenodis Vitzthum, 1920
 Uropoda austroasiatica Vitzthum, 1921
 Uropoda azteka Vitzthum, 1920
 Uropoda bengalica
 Uropoda berndti Wisniewski, 1984
 Uropoda bisetosa Banks
 Uropoda bistellaris Vitzthum, 1933
 Uropoda caenorychodis Vitzthum, 1921
 Uropoda clavisetosa Banks
 Uropoda convexifrons Banks, 1916
 Uropoda copridis (Oudemans, 1916)
 Uropoda debilior Vitzthum, 1925
 Uropoda diademata Vitzthum, 1920
 Uropoda distinguenda Berlese, 1903
 Uropoda dryocoetis Vitzthum, 1923
 Uropoda ecuadorica Kontschán, 2012
 Uropoda essigi Banks
 Uropoda fallax Vitzthum, 1926
 Uropoda febris Vitzthum, 1926
 Uropoda fraterna Banks, 1916
 Uropoda frontalis Banks
 Uropoda fumicola (Schweizer, 1961)
 Uropoda halberti Hirschmann, 1993
 Uropoda hirschmanni Hiramatsu, 1977
 Uropoda hispanica Hirschmann & Zirngiebl-Nicol, 1969
 Uropoda inflata (Berlese, 1916)
 Uropoda ingens Vitzthum, 1925
 Uropoda inhaerens Vitzthum, 1921
 Uropoda italica Hirschmann & Zirngiebl-Nicol, 1969
 Uropoda kargi Hirschmann & Zirngiebl-Nicol, 1969
 Uropoda karnai
 Uropoda lagena Berlese, 1882
 Uropoda lativentris Vitzthum, 1926
 Uropoda lawrencei
 Uropoda lichenicola
 Uropoda longifrons Banks, 1916
 Uropoda madagascariensis Vitzthum, 1921
 Uropoda masculinata Vitzthum, 1933
 Uropoda michaeliana Leonardi, 1896
 Uropoda michiganensis Vitzthum, 1926
 Uropoda minima Kramer, 1882
 Uropoda minor (Berlese, 1887)
 Uropoda mira Vitzthum, 1921
 Uropoda misella (Berlese, 1916)
 Uropoda obscura C.L.Koch
 Uropoda orbicularis (Mueller, 1776)
 Uropoda orychodis Vitzthum, 1920
 Uropoda parva (Schweizer, 1961)
 Uropoda philippinensis Vitzthum, 1920
 Uropoda polygraphi Vitzthum, 1923
 Uropoda productior Berlese, 1916
 Uropoda promiscua Vitzthum, 1921
 Uropoda pulcherrima (Berlese, 1903)
 Uropoda replectus Berlese, 1904
 Uropoda repleta (Berlese, 1904)
 Uropoda scelerum Vitzthum, 1926
 Uropoda setata
 Uropoda simplex Berlese, 1903
 Uropoda spiculata
 Uropoda spinosula Kneissl, 1915
 Uropoda splendida Kramer, 1882
 Uropoda submarginata Banks, 1916
 Uropoda tarsale Rob.-Desvoidy, 1832
 Uropoda tasmanica Banks, 1916
 Uropoda thorpei Kontschán, 2012
 Uropoda transportabilis Vitzthum, 1921
 Uropoda trilobata Banks, 1916
 Uropoda turcica
 Uropoda uvaeformis Vitzthum, 1921
 Uropoda vegetans (De Geer, 1768)
 Uropoda wichmanni Vitzthum, 1923
 Uropoda willmanni Hirschmann & Zirngiebl-Nicol, 1969

References

Uropodidae
Articles created by Qbugbot